Li Hongyi (born 26 June 1998) is a Chinese actor and singer. He is best known for his roles in the dramas Master Devil Do Not Kiss Me (2017), My Love from the Ocean (2018), Love Better Than Immortality (2019), Prodigy Healer (2019), The Blood of Youth (2022–2023), and Wulin Heroes (2023).

Early life and education
Li Hongyi was born on 26 June 1998 in Liaoning, Shenyang, China. He is a graduate of the Beijing Contemporary Music Academy.

Li was a former apprentice SM Entertainment. His training in South Korea was only for three months, due to various reasons, he opted to resign and return to China to continue his studies.

Career

2014: Career beginnings
In 2014, Li made his acting debut in the sitcom Sister Knows. He was then cast in the fantasy web drama Intouchable .

2016–present: Rising popularity
In 2016, Li made his big screen debut in the youth romance film Yesterday Once More. The low-budget film was a box office hit, and led to increased recognition for Li. In just three days, the box office has exceeded the 100 million yuan mark. 

In 2017, Li played the lead role in the romance comedy series Master Devil Do Not Kiss Me. The web drama was a hit and led to increased popularity for Li. The first season broke through 100 million views in 5 days, and the second season broke through in just 50 hours.

In 2018, Li starred in the fantasy romance web series My Love From the Ocean, breaking 100 million views in two days and science fiction web drama 24 Hours. 

In 2019, Li starred in fantasy period drama Prodigy Healer, and historical romance drama Love Better Than Immortality.

In 2020, Li starred in the workplace romance drama Parallel Love. The same year he was cast in the historical drama Winner Is King, adapted from the BL novel Sha Po Lang by Priest.

In 2022, Li starred in the hit wuxia drama The Blood of Youth. The show's popularity exceeded the 10,000 heat index on Youku, becoming the first Youku drama with a 10,000-point hit for the year 2023.

Filmography

Film

Television series

Television show

Discography

Awards

References

Chinese male television actors
21st-century Chinese male actors
1998 births
Living people
Male actors from Liaoning